Adele Adkins (born 1988) is an English singer-songwriter.

Adele may also refer to:

People
 Adele (given name), a common female given name
Jan Adele (1936–2000), Australian actor
 Adele, a character in the operetta Die Fledermaus

Places
 Adele, California or Fields Landing, California
 Adele, Kentucky, an unincorporated community
 Adele Island (Australia), Western Australia
 Adele Island (New Zealand), off the northern coast of South Island of New Zealand
 Adele, Ethiopia, village in the Shinile Zone of Ethiopia
 Adele, town in the Amigna woreda of Ethiopia

Ships
 Australian steamer Adele
 French brig Adèle
 Adele (1952 ship), Swiss merchant ship
 Adèle (1800 brig), privateer brig, later an armed brig for the British East India Company, and a fire ship for the Royal Navy

Film and theatre
 Adele (film), a 1919 film by Wallace Worsley
The Story of Adèle H., a French film about Adèle Hugo
Blue Is the Warmest Colour (La vie d'Adèle), a movie which won the Palme d'Or in 2013
 Adele (musical), a 1913 musical
 Dinner for Adele, a 1977 Czech film

Other uses
 Adele language, a language spoken in Ghana and Togo
 Adele people of Ghana and Togo
 812 Adele, an asteroid
 Adele ring, a concept in topological algebra

See also
 Portrait of Adele Bloch-Bauer I and Adele Bloch-Bauer II, paintings by Gustav Klimt
 Adel (disambiguation)
 Adela (disambiguation)
 Adell (disambiguation)
 Adeli (disambiguation)